Khalid Salum Mohamed (born 5 October 1961) is a Zanzibari/Tanzanian politician and House Representative for Donge Constituency since 2016. Khalid Mohamed was a finalist in the 2020 CCM Zanzibar presidential primaries and lost the nomination to Dr. Hussein Mwinyi.

References

1961 births
Living people
Chama Cha Mapinduzi MPs
Sokoine University of Agriculture alumni
Alumni of the University of Reading